Batkhela is the main tehsil, city and capital of Malakand District, Khyber Pakhtunkhwa, Pakistan. According to the 6th Population & Housing Census - the 2017 Census of Pakistan, the population of Batkhela was recorded at 68,200. Batkhela is a popular business city in Khyber Pakhtunkhwa province.  One water canal that pours into a small dam in Jabban area is the main source of electricity production.

Batkhela General Civil Headquarters Hospital is the main hospital of the district Malakand.
Batkhela's main bazaar is more than 2 kilometres long; there are no intersections (junctions) so there are no traffic lights. Therefore, it is the longest bazaar in Pakistan and also in Asia that has no traffic lights or junctions (intersections) on it.

History

Etymology

During the Ashoka and Kanishka Empires Batkhela was ruled by a leader named Butt hence city has given the name Batkhela.

Early history

When Mahmud of Ghazni (997-1030) was attacking India against the Hindus, during this time one of his army leaders Pir Khushal assailed Batkhela. During the course of this assault, most of his soldiers were sunk in a big marsh at a place called Ghelai in Batkhela. However, the soldiers of his army that survived had preferred to stay in this region. They have not only changed the culture and customs of the local inhabitants but also exerted a strong influence on them to make them convert to Islam.

Early in the 17th century an Afghan tribe called the Yusufzai (Yusufzai Pathan) invaded the Swat region under the leadership of Malik Ahmad Khan. During this period Batkhela was part of Swat valley. At the time, Swat was ruled by a ruler named Raees and the Swati tribe was a permanent inhabitant there. After the invasion, most of the Swati tribesmen left this area and escaped and some of them still exist. It gave the Yusufzai an opportunity to settle there permanently and they declared the Thana region (currently part of Batkhela tehsil) as their administrative headquarters.

In the beginning, three family classes of Yusufzai tribe were settled in Batkhela (Ibrahim Khel, Husain Khel and Nazrali Khel).

In March 1895 the British Empire invaded this region including Batkhela. Malak Mir Azam Khan of Ibrahim Khel was leading the army of Batkhela. A new political agency for Dir, Swat and Chitral was established. The first officer to be placed in charge of the new Malakand Agency was Major Harold Arthur Deane(1854–1908), later on 9 November 1901 Lieutenant Colonel Sir Harold Arthur Deane also became the first Chief Commissioner on the formation of the North-West Frontier Province (now Khyber Pakhtunkhwa).

That year when Batkhela was stormed by the 45th Sikhs after a fierce resistance, Lieut.-Colonel McRae was the very first British Army personnel to enter Batkhela. Before 1895 Batkhela was invaded by different outsiders including Khan of Dir Rahmatullah Khan in 1869 and Wali-i-Dir/Nawab Muhammad Umara Khan as well as the Swatis. On capturing Malakand Agency, the British Army decided to secure this area permanently from these outside aggressions. The British rulers declared this area as a 'Malakand Protected Area' (same as present) and so they prepared a police force called the Malakand Levies.

Between 1895 and 1912, the British made a huge impact on developmental works and infrastructure. They built roads (Batkhela to Chakdara), raised Chakdara and Malakand forts, set up Levies posts all over Malakand Agency, dug Upper Swat Canal and The Benton Tunnel (locally known as Tandail) and constructed Headwork's scheme at Batkhela, Churchill Picket and Jabban Hydropower Station (Jabban Hydropower Plant). The most important of all is the Amandara (part of Batkhela) Irrigation Scheme (bridges) which were designed and built by the British firm Ransomes & Rapier, Ltd. Makers of Ipswich in 1912, which is still irrigating a vast land of Sama Tehsil, Mardan and Sawabi Districts and Chakdara area.

The British ruled this area until the independence of Pakistan on 14 August 1947. All matters of the Tribal system were settled through the ‘Jirga System'. The Frontier Crimes Regulation (FCR) system or status was established in 1974 here. Furthermore, regular laws prevailing and the settle laws of district were also extended. Under the FCR, the Political Agent exercised his powers as a supreme authority while regular courts were established (Civil & Crime courts) after the year 1974.

Governance
Police in district Malakand are known as Levies and their head or commandant is the District Coordination Officer (DCO). The current Tehsil Nazim of Batkhela is Fazal Wahid Lalagi Jamat Islami.

Geography
Batkhela is a green city and Swat River is flowing in the middle of the city alongside N45. Batkhela is covered by tall hills from all sides and the most of famous peak of them is named 'Barcharai'.

Division
Politically, Batkhela is divided into three union councils e.g. Upper, middle, and lower Batkhela.

Demography
According to the 6th Population & Housing Census 2017, the population of Batkhela was declared as 68,200. Data on religious beliefs across the town in the 2017 census shows that 100% of its population has declared themselves to be Muslim.

People and culture
More than 95% of local residents are Pashtuns, who are the indigenous inhabitants of the region.

Education
A Primary School was opened in Batkhela in 1915 and a High School was opened in Thana (part of Batkhela tehsil) in 1935 by British rulers.
At present, there is one Degree College for boys, One Degree college for girls, two Secondary Schools for boys and one High Secondary School for girls that are functioning. In addition, there are several private schools and colleges functioning throughout this region. All schools and colleges are affiliated with the Board of Intermediate & Secondary Education (BISE) Malakand.

Media 
The District Press Club Malakand at Batkhela has been functional since 1988 in a rented building while reporters attached with the national, regional and local print and electronic media organizations have been performing their duties with devotion and sincerity. 
The former minister for information had approved funds for a well-equipped press club building at Batkhela during their term. The remaining funds were approved later on. The construction work on the building has been completed now. Soon, it will be inaugurated making the work of local journalists easier. 
The first-ever "monthly," the Hidayat Nama, was started by the late Muhammad Islam Ajmali who has been regarded as founder of journalism in the area. Later on, Mr. Amjad Ali Khan started his monthly Tasht from Batkhela that was closed after a few years. The Monthly 'Nazar' of Gohar Ali Gohar also closed after two years of circulation. Rab Nawaz Saghir started his 'Akas' that closed, too. Mr. Ihsan ur Rehman Sagar started a monthly Adrash which has been the first-ever declared newspaper from the area. It was made a weekly sometime later and then a daily newspaper, but was delisted by the KP Govt.

References

Populated places in Malakand District
Cities in Khyber Pakhtunkhwa